Entrenchment, Entrenched or Entrench may refer to:
 A trench
 Entrenchment (fortification), a type of fortification
 Military trenches with relation to Trench warfare, especially that of World War I 
 An entrenchment clause within a constitution, a clause impervious to or somewhat shielded from the amendment process.
 Entrenchment hypothesis, in financial theory
 The process forming an Entrenched river, a process of erosion
 Entrench (album), a 2013 album by the Canadian band KEN mode